Reza Satchu is an East African-born Canadian entrepreneur who has founded a number of high-profile businesses and charities. Satchu is the co-founder and managing partner of Alignvest Management Corporation, the founding chairman of NEXT Canada and a senior lecturer at the Harvard Business School.

Early life and education

Born in Mombasa, Kenya, to Rustom and Zarina Satchu, Reza Satchu was seven years old when his family emigrated to Toronto in 1976 as part of Canadian Prime Minister Pierre Trudeau's policy to accept Ismaili immigrants from East Africa. Satchu's family soon settled in the Toronto suburb of Scarborough, where his father Rustom worked as a real estate agent and his mother Zarina as a secretary.

Following high school, Satchu attended Montreal's McGill University. Initially intending to become a physician, which he described as a "typical Indian family [thing to do]," he switched majors and received a bachelor's degree in economics in 1991. Upon graduation, Satchu moved to New York City and worked as a financial analyst for Merrill Lynch, but found the post limiting, saying "I wanted to be someone who was actually creating something." Satchu then entered Harvard Business School, graduating in 1996 with an MBA.

Career

Business and finance

After receiving his MBA in 1996, Satchu joined Fenway Partners, a New York-based private equity firm specializing in acquisitions of underperforming companies, as managing director.<ref
name="dunfield–globeandmail"/>

In 2000, the 30 year old Satchu, his brother Asif Satchu and Jon Burgstone sold SupplierMarket.com, a B2B supply chain software company to SAP Ariba for $925 million . Satchu and his wife Marion Annau then left New York, moving back to Toronto to start a family. In 2003, Satchu co-founded StorageNow, a consumer storage facility chain, which they built into Canada's second largest storage company before selling it in 2007 for $110 million. In 2007, Satchu received Canada's “Top 40 Under 40” award. In 2010, Satchu co-founded fixed income broker-dealer KGS-Alpha Capital Markets, specializing in U.S. mortgage-backed and asset-backed securities, which with 135 employees was sold to Bank of Montreal for over $400 million. In 2014, Satchu founded Alignvest Management Corporation, a private investment firm. He currently serves as the Managing Partner of Alignvest Management Corporation.

Academic posts

Beginning in 2004, Satchu taught a popular undergraduate course at the University of Toronto titled The Economics of Entrepreneurship. Drawing no salary as an adjunct professor, he awarded the top students in each class $5,000 scholarships with his own money. In 2011, McGill University selected Satchu as one of three recipients of its Management Achievement Award, meant to highlight alumni who serve as role models for McGill's students. He is currently a senior lecturer at Harvard Business School where he teaches entrepreneurship courses including Launching Technology Ventures and The Entrepreneurial Manager.

Next Canada

In 2010, Satchu founded the Next 36, an organization which annually offers entrepreneurial students an eight-month program at the University of Toronto in which they learn from guest lecturers and mentors how to develop their ideas to successfully launch new businesses. In 2016, the Next 36 was renamed Next Canada and two more programs were added, Next Founders for more advanced startups and Next AI for entrepreneurs in the field of artificial intelligence.

References

Living people
Year of birth missing (living people)
Canadian Ismailis
Canadian Muslims
Canadian people of Kenyan descent
Canadian people of Indian descent
Canadian business executives
McGill University alumni
Harvard Business School alumni